Mayte Espinosa is a paralympic athlete from Spain competing mainly in category B1 distance running events.

Mayte competed at the 1992, 1996 and 2000 Summer Paralympics in a variety of track distances.  In 1992 she won her only medal, a bronze, in the 1500m as well as finishing fourth in the 3000m and fifth in the 800m.  In 1996 she competed in the 1500m finishing fifth and the 3000m though she failed to finish.  Her final games in Sydney in 2000 she failed to finish in the 400m and 1500m but did finish seventh in the 5000m.

References

External links
 

Year of birth missing (living people)
Living people
Paralympic athletes of Spain
Paralympic bronze medalists for Spain
Paralympic medalists in athletics (track and field)
Paralympic athletes with a vision impairment
Athletes (track and field) at the 1992 Summer Paralympics
Athletes (track and field) at the 1996 Summer Paralympics
Athletes (track and field) at the 2000 Summer Paralympics
Medalists at the 1992 Summer Paralympics
Spanish female middle-distance runners
Visually impaired middle-distance runners
Paralympic middle-distance runners
Spanish blind people